Adriano Bernareggi (9 November 1884 – 1953) was an Italian Catholic archbishop.

Biography
Born in Oreno, near Milan, was the brother of future bishop Domenico Bernareggi.

He was ordained a Roman Catholic priest in 1907. He graduated from Pontifical Gregorian University in canon law, after graduation became a teacher of canon law at the Milan Roman Catholic diocesan seminary. After a few years, Father Agostino Gemelli offered him a post as professor of ecclesiastic law at Catholic University in Milan.

Cardinal Achille Ratti named him pastor at San Vittore al Corpo in Milan. On 16 December Pope Pius XI appointed him coadiutor bishop with right of succession of the Roman Catholic diocese of Bergamo. In 1936 Bernareggi succeeded bishop Marelli as bishop of Bergamo. Bernareggi was promoted by Pope Pius XII as archbishop in 1952.

Bernareggi died on 23 June 1953. During his episcopacy in the territory of the diocese reported visions of Our Lady of Ghiaie di Bonate occurred.

References

External links and additional sources
 (for Chronology of Bishops) 
 (for Chronology of Bishops) 

1884 births
1953 deaths
People from Vimercate
Bishops of Bergamo
20th-century Italian Roman Catholic bishops
Pontifical Gregorian University alumni
Academic staff of the Università Cattolica del Sacro Cuore